Velký Týnec is a municipality and village in Olomouc District in the Olomouc Region of the Czech Republic. It has about 3,000 inhabitants.

Administrative parts
Villages of Čechovice and Vsisko are administrative parts of Velký Týnec.

History
The first written mention of Velký Týnec is from 1207.

References

Villages in Olomouc District